The King Boat Cultural Museum is a museum under construction in Donggang Township, Pingtung County, Taiwan.

History
The planning to establish the museum started in 2018 to preserve the King Boat ceremony culture. The groundbreaking ceremony for the museum was held on 22 December 2021 officiated by Pingtung County Magistrate Pan Men-an. The museum is scheduled to be opened in 2024.

Architecture
The design of the museum resembles a ship on the sea. It has an opening at the top to represent the eye of a dragon and wavy lines at the bottom to represent the sea waves. The museum will also include a theater, audio visual room, library and classroom.

See also
 List of museums in Taiwan

References

Museums in Pingtung County
Buildings and structures under construction in Taiwan